Aegle may refer to:

 Aegle (mythology), a number of characters from Greek mythology
 96 Aegle, an asteroid
 Aegle (plant), a genus of plants in the family Rutaceae
 Aegle (moth), a genus of moths in the family Noctuidae
 Aegle, the Equatoguinean Academy of the Spanish Language (Spanish: Academia Ecuatoguineana de la Lengua Española)